Pocé-sur-Cisse (literally Pocé on Cisse) is a commune in the Indre-et-Loire department in central France.

Population

See also
Communes of the Indre-et-Loire department

References

Communes of Indre-et-Loire